Sallie Alcorn is an American politician who has held political office as an at-large council member in the City of Houston, Texas since 2020. Alcorn collected 22.8% of the votes in the November 5, 2019 general election, which triggered a runoff. She won her runoff election on December 14, 2019 with 52.8% (90,235) of the vote. Although Houston City Council had previously held a female majority from 2006-2007, Alcorn will be serving with the largest number of female council members elected to office at one time in council history after the District B election is settled.

Early life and education
Alcorn (nee Comstock) was born in North Carolina and moved to Houston when she was in the seventh grade, later graduating from Westchester High School. She received a BBA in finance from the University of Texas at Austin and an MA in Public Administration from the University of Houston. She is married to George Alcorn with 4 children, and is a member of St. Michael the Archangel Catholic Church.

Political career
Alcorn’s first run for public office was in 2019, the race that she won. She accumulated the largest number of votes in a 9-person race which secured her seat a runoff against Eric Dick, which Alcorn won.

Since being elected to office, Sallie has focused on facilitating shared services between the City of Houston and Harris County, increasing transparency and community engagement surrounding the municipal budget, and focusing on ensuring the City of Houston prioritizes smart fiscal policies. Most recently, through unanimous approval of Council, Sallie passed an amendment that prioritizes identifying areas in which the City of Houston and Harris County governments can increase cooperation and streamline efforts, reducing the cost of operations and improving services to the residents of Houston and Harris County.

Alcorn assumed office to represent At-Large Position 5 of the Houston City Council on January 2, 2020 succeeding Jack Christie.

References

Year of birth missing (living people)
Living people
Texas Democrats
Houston City Council members
University of Texas at Austin alumni
Women city councillors in Texas
University of Houston alumni
21st-century American women